Randy Glass started off as a con man and later became a trusted U.S. undercover operative. He was part of a mission to snare terrorist arms buyers.

He was a jewelry dealer in Boca Raton, Florida who defrauded diamond & jewelry wholesalers of $6M.  His sentence was reduced to 7 months for his participation in the FBI's illegal weapons purchase sting "Operation Diamondback".

References

External links
https://web.archive.org/web/20080306061647/http://www.cooperativeresearch.org/entity.jsp?entity=randy_glass
http://s3.amazonaws.com/911timeline/main/randyglass.html
Transcript Of Dateline NBC story about Randy Glass

Further reading

Year of birth missing (living people)
Living people
American confidence tricksters